A wallflower is someone with an introverted personality type (or in more extreme cases, social anxiety) who will attend parties and social gatherings, but will usually distance themselves from the crowd and actively avoid being in the limelight. They are also social around friends but not strangers, though once around friends, the strangers become less impactful.

The name itself derives from the eponymous plant's unusual growth pattern against a wall as a stake or in cracks and gaps in stone walls. "Wallflowers" might literally stand against a wall and simply observe others at a social gathering, rather than mingle.

Connection to sociology

Structural function theory
Structural functionalism is a sociological theory that sees society as a number of complex parts that form a stable and functional whole. This leads to a strong and coherent family unit made of smaller parts, with the functioning family unit then going on to form the smaller parts of a wider community, society and so on.

Social conflict theory
Social conflict theory in sociology claims that society is in a state of perpetual grace conflict due to competition for limited resources. It holds that social order is maintained by domination and power, rather than consensus and conformity. According to conflict theory, those with wealth and power try to hold on to it by any means possible, chiefly by suppressing the poor and powerless.

Symbolic interaction theory
The most relevant sociological theory that the "wallflower" relates to, symbolic interaction describes specific gestures or social norms that are symbolic in meaning. The theory consists of three core principles: meaning, language and thought. These core principles lead to conclusions about the creation of a person’s self and socialization into a larger community.

Because the "wallflower" will usually exhibit a lack of interaction with others, it becomes symbolic of their thoughts and feelings towards others. The most specific example would be in the body language. During many times, people who are shy have little or no eye contact with others. A person may see a man, woman, or child try to avoid eye contact with others while out walking around in public or even in private. For some, this may be a condition that becomes consistent over time and become a normal action.

In the case of parties or social gatherings, the "wallflower" will remain at a certain distance from the crowd or most of the people. When a shy person is around others you may see that they do what they can to stay away from the people that they do not know. Even with some friends, you may or may not see the shy man or woman even near or in the Bell Bubble or within the intimate distance of friends. In a social setting, you may not see a shy person in the center of the room without a friend or group of friends. Shy people tend to stay out of the possibility of even being the center of attention.

Social anxiety
Social anxiety is the extreme fear of being scrutinized and judged by others in social or performance situations. Social anxiety disorder can wreak havoc on the lives of those who suffer from it. Symptoms may be so extreme that they disrupt daily life. People with this disorder, also called social phobia, may have few or no social or romantic relationships, making them feel powerless, alone, or even ashamed.

Although they recognize that the fear is excessive and unreasonable, people with social anxiety disorder feel powerless against their anxiety. They are terrified they will humiliate or embarrass themselves. The anxiety can interfere significantly with daily routines, occupational performance, or social life, making it difficult to complete school, interview and get a job, and have friendships and romantic relationships.

Being a wallflower can be considered a less-intense form of social anxiety. A person with social anxiety may feel a sense of hesitation in large crowds, and may even have a sense of panic if forced to become the center of attention. This fear may cause them to do something as minor as stand away from the center of a party, but it may also cause a major or minor anxiety attack.

People with social anxiety disorder do not believe that their anxiety is related to a mental or physical illness. This type of anxiety occurs in most social situations, especially when the person feels on display or is the center of attention. Once a person avoids almost all social and public interactions, it can be said that the person has an extreme case of social anxiety disorder, more commonly called Avoidant Personality Disorder. People with social anxiety disorder have an elevated rate of relationship difficulties and substance abuse.

Panic and anxiety attacks
Anxiety attacks are a combination of physical and mental symptoms that are intense and overwhelming. The anxiety is, however, more than just regular nervousness. Symptoms of anxiety attacks and panic attacks mimic serious medical issues, such as:

 Heart attacks and heart failure.
 Brain tumors.
 Multiple sclerosis.
Despite their intensity, anxiety attacks are generally not life-threatening.

In popular culture
 In the novel The Perks of Being a Wallflower by Stephen Chbosky, as well as in the film adaptation of the same title, the main character Charlie often finds himself alone in school or at parties. He also suffers from anxiety and depression.
 In the song "Here" by Alessia Cara, the artist describes wanting to enjoy herself at home and not attend any parties with her friends.
 Bob Dylan sings about a wallflower in the song "Wallflower" from 1971.
 Jakob Dylan, son of Bob Dylan, founded the popular band the Wallflowers in 1989.
 In the song "Wallflower" by In Flames, from the album Battles, they describe life from the perspective of a wallflower.
 In the My Little Pony spin-off Equestria Girls, the 2018 special "Forgotten Friendship" features the character Wallflower Blush who is an extreme introvert, says her only friends are the plants in her garden and who sings the song "Invisible" about nobody ever taking notice of her existence.
 In the song "Wallflower" from the album Wallflowers by Ukrainian metal band Jinjer, the vocalist describes herself being a wallflower.
 In the song "Stall Me (Bonus Track)" from the deluxe version of the album Vices & Virtues by rock band Panic! at the Disco, the lyrics mention a 'wallflower garden', meaning a group of people who are collectively distancing themselves from the rest of the party.
 In the song "WALLFLOWER" by K-Pop girl group Twice, the lyrics are about seducing a wallflower.

See also
Hermit
Loner
Recluse

References

Human communication
Behaviorism
Personality typologies